1768 Appenzella is a rare-type Nysian asteroid from the inner regions of the asteroid belt, approximately 20 kilometers in diameter. It was discovered on 23 September 1965, by Swiss astronomer Paul Wild at Zimmerwald Observatory near Bern, Switzerland. It was later named after the Swiss canton of Appenzell.

Classification and orbit 

Appenzella is a dark carbonaceous asteroid and a member of the Polanian subgroup of the Nysa family. On the Tholen taxonomic scheme, it belongs to the small group of 28 bodies known to have a F-type spectrum.

It orbits the Sun in the inner main-belt at a distance of 2.0–2.9 AU once every 3 years and 10 months (1,402 days). Its orbit has an eccentricity of 0.18 and an inclination of 3° with respect to the ecliptic. The first used observation was made at the Finnish Turku Observatory in 1942, extending the asteroid's observation arc by 23 years prior to its discovery.

Lightcurve 

In November 2011, a rotational lightcurve of Appenzella was obtained by French astronomer René Roy at his Blauvac Observatory (627) in southeastern France. Lightcurve analysis gave a well-defined a rotation period of  hours with a brightness variation of 0.53 magnitude. In 2016, remodeled photometric data from the Lowell database gave in a very similar period of 5.18335 hours.

Diameter and albedo 

Based on the surveys carried out by NASA's Wide-field Infrared Survey Explorer and its subsequent NEOWISE mission, the asteroid measures between 19.0 and 21 kilometers in diameter and its surface has a low albedo between 0.03 and 0.04. The Collaborative Asteroid Lightcurve Link agrees with the results obtained by the Infrared Astronomical Satellite, IRAS, which found an albedo of 0.034 and a mean diameter of 20.9 kilometers, with an absolute magnitude of 12.7.

Naming 

In 1971, Appenzella was named by the discoverer in honor of the rural Swiss canton of Appenzell, during the treat of the 150th anniversary of the public middle school "Kantonsschule Trogen", Appenzell Ausserrhoden, founded in 1821. The official  was published by the Minor Planet Center on 1 July 1972.

References

External links 
 Image from SDSS survey, 1.55au from Earth on 15DEC2004 Fermats Brother
 Asteroid Lightcurve Database (LCDB), query form (info )
 Dictionary of Minor Planet Names, Google books
 Asteroids and comets rotation curves, CdR – Observatoire de Genève, Raoul Behrend
 Discovery Circumstances: Numbered Minor Planets (1)-(5000) – Minor Planet Center
 
 

Nysa asteroids
Appenzella
Appenzella
C-type asteroids (SMASS)
F-type asteroids (Tholen)
19650923